The New York sour is an IBA official cocktail. Largely similar to the whiskey sour, the New York sour adds a float of dry red wine to the drink.

See also
 List of cocktails

References

Cocktails with whisky
Cocktails with wine